Felice Le Monnier (born Verdun, 1 December 1806 - died in Florence, 27 June 1884) was an Italian publisher.

Biography 
Born in France to Jean Le Monnier and Jeanne Michaud, he started his military career, whose rigid discipline, however, was ill-suited to his free and inharmonious character. He fled from the Enrico IV school in Paris, and then was expelled.

The father, for punishment and to start it for a profession, entrusted him to a family friend who headed a print shop in Paris. Forced to become a typist, Felice Le Monnier discovered, by accident, his vocation. In a short time he mastered all the secrets of the craft and in a few years became professional.

Relocation to Florence 
In the capital of the Grand Duchy of Tuscany, Le Monnier did not have difficulty finding work and entered the typography of Passigli and Borghi.

In 1837 he founded with Borghi la Felice Le Monnier and C. It is the origin of the historic Le Monnier publishing house, still active today within the publishing group Mondadori. The new company for the first years worked as a simple typography, but Le Monnier, who in 1840 had reached the full ownership of the entire company, cultivated an ambitious project: to become a publisher. Thus was published in 1841 the first book chosen, chosen and promoted by Felice: The Speeches on the Italian stories of Canon Giuseppe Borghi.

In the following decades, Le Monnier, while never interrupting the printing business on behalf of third parties (practices, among other things, common to all 19th century Italian publishers), built one of the most prestigious editorials in Italy, always coherently guided by a precise and modern philosophy, at the same time commercial and cultural. The Monnier was addressing the new broad public of the middle classes, the new emerging, unity and patriotic bourgeoisie. His choices followed the design, clear from the beginning, to publish works that would satisfy, as he himself stated, "the political concept and the literary criterion", that they associate patriotic spirit and artistic value. Frenchman Le Monnier then became a protagonist of the Risorgimento feelings of moderate Italy.

The National Library 
The first great commercial success, the Arnaldo da Brescia by Giovan Battista Niccolini (1843), was perfectly in line with these premises, and there is no shortage of attention to Grand Ducal censorship. Niccolini's drama inaugurates the "National Library", a prestigious event from the rigorous pink covers that soon became the instrument of Le Monnier's cultural policy and the source of its greatest commercial success.

The National Library did not exhaust the editorial activity of Le Monnier, which printed periodicals and newspapers, both on behalf of third parties (La Patria) and on its own (The Gazette of the People, with an independent, unified, monarchical program). Intriguing intuitions and intended to develop in the future of the Le Monnier editorial brand, to this day, were the publication of dictionaries (from the vocabulary of the Italian language by Pietro Fanfani of 1855) and of school books (since 1856).

The Case of the Promessi Sposi 
Felice Le Monnier was also starring in "excellent" the widespread violation of copyright; in 1845 he republished the promised spouses in the edition of Passigli of 1832, without the permission of Alessandro Manzoni (who had published the final edition in the meantime). From this episode was born a long cause that ended only in 1864, with the full victory of Manzoni. The Monnier, who defended himself by invoking the non-retroactivity of the Austro-Sardinian Convention on Copyright in 1840, was sentenced to compensation of 34,000 lire.

In addition to this famous episode, which attracted the attention of leading jurists, Le Monnier, following a widespread custom at the time especially among small publishers, printed pirate editions of other works, including Margherita Pusterla by Cesare Cantù and Marco Visconti by Thomas Grossi.

The sale of the company and the death 
In 1865, disappointed by the new climate of united Italy, which he believed was dominated by politicians and far from the ideals that had led the Risorgimento struggles, and beginning to feel the weight of the age, Felice Le Monnier gave the company ownership to a company (Società Successori Le Monnier), formed by notable Florentines and Tuscans and presided over by Bettino Ricasoli, which impressed the publishing house with a culturally less defined editorial policy.

Felice Le Monnier, who remained in the company as director until 1879, fled to Florence and died on June 27, 1884.

He is buried in the Sacred Doors Cemetery in Florence.

Letters and Scraps 
 Giuseppe Giusti , New Unpublished Letters by Giuseppe Giusti at Felice Le Monnier , Florence, Tip. G. Carnesecchi and fi, 18;
 Nino Cortese , Giannina Milli and her poetry edition in the National Library of Felice Le Monnier (Unpublished Letters) , in Abruzzo Magazine of Letters and Linguistics, 1914, p. 505 and sgg;
 The Monnier-Jordanian, The Primates of the National Library of Felice Le Monnier in LX Letters to Him , Edited by I.Del Long. Florence, Le Monnier 1916.

Notes 
  Maria Iolanda Palazzolo , Geography and Dynamics of Publishing Settlements , in History of Publishing in Contemporary Italy by Gabriele Turi, Florence, Giunti, 1997, pp. 42–43

References 

 Camillo Raineri-Biscia, Works of the National Library published by Cav. Felice Le Monnier and successors , described and illustrated by Camillo Raineri Biscia, Livorno, F. Vigo, 1880;
 Catalog of Felice Le Monnier typographer-publisher , Florence, 1865, and later 1882, 1911, 1934, 1954, 1958;
 Cosimo Ceccuti, a publisher of the Risorgimento Felice Le Monnier , Florence, Le Monnier, 1974.
 Cosimo Ceccuti, Le Monnier from the Risorgimento alla Repubblica (1837-1987). Centenarians for Culture and School , Florence, Le Monnier, 1987.

Italian publishers (people)
People from Verdun
1806 births
1884 deaths